Alain Trogneux (born 1955) is a French teacher and local historian. He is a history professor in Amiens, and the author of several books about the local history of Picardy.

Early life
Alain Trogneux was born in 1955.

Career
Trogneux worked for the archives of the Somme in 1992.

Trogneux is a history professor for Classe préparatoire aux grandes écoles at the Lycée Louis-Thuillier in Amiens. He is also a corresponding member of the Institute of Contemporary History at the French National Center for Scientific Research.

Trogneux is the author of several books about the history of Amiens and Picardy. He has also published articles about the Algerian War in Paris Match.

Works

References

Living people
1955 births
People from Amiens
French local historians
20th-century French historians
21st-century French historians